Valery Alexandrovich Barinov (born in 1945) is a Russian actor. 
He was the People's Artist of Russia in 1999. Valery appeared in more than 200 films.

Biography
Valery was born in the village of Zhilina, Oryol Oblast. Studied as an actor in the studio at the Oryol Drama Theater and at the Mikhail Shchepkin Higher Theatre School, after which he took part in the work of various theaters. In 1968 he made his film debut.

Selected filmography

References

External links
Valery Barinov on kino-teatr.ru

1945 births
Living people
Russian male film actors
Soviet male film actors

People's Artists of Russia

People from Oryol Oblast
Honored Artists of the RSFSR